John Augspurger Farm No. 1 is a registered historic building near Trenton, Ohio, listed in the National Register on 1984-08-03.

Historic uses 
Single Dwelling

Notes

External links
Ohio Historic Inventory

Houses on the National Register of Historic Places in Ohio
National Register of Historic Places in Butler County, Ohio
Houses in Butler County, Ohio